Liliane Germaine "Lylian" Lecomte-Guyonnea (21 October 1921 – 9 May 2004) was a French fencer. She competed in the women's individual foil event at the 1952 Summer Olympics.

References

External links
 

1921 births
2004 deaths
French female foil fencers
Olympic fencers of France
Fencers at the 1952 Summer Olympics
20th-century French women